Nogent-sur-Vernisson is a commune in the eastern part of the Loiret department in the Centre-Val de Loire region central-north France.

It had a population of 2,589 in 2019. The main employer in the town is the CIMRG plant which manufactures components for Renault cars and employs some 800 people. Nogent-sur-Vernisson station has rail connections to Montargis, Nevers and Paris.

Nogent-sur-Vernisson is the site of the Arboretum national des Barres, adjacent to which is a division of the research agency Irstea (formerly Cemagref), which works to conserve the genetic resources of native trees.

The town has a 12th-century AD church of St Martin in which Pope Pius VII celebrated Mass while on his way to the coronation of Napoleon Bonaparte in 1804. There are also remains of walls from Roman times.

Points of interest
 Arboretum national des Barres

Twin towns
 Castleblayney in County Monaghan, Ireland

Gallery

See also
 Communes of the Loiret department

References

External links 

 

Nogentsurvernisson
Orléanais